Spy Booth was an artwork by Banksy in Cheltenham, England. The piece has been seen as a critique of the global surveillance disclosures of 2013.

In 2014, Robin Barton and Bankrobber London helped with the preservation of the artwork, and attempted to broker the removal and sale of the piece. However the artwork was painted onto a Grade II listed building (153–159 Fairview Road) and the council prevented it from being removed, giving it retrospective listed building consent in 2015 and affording it some protection from removal. Despite this, the artwork was removed, destroying it in August 2016. Spy Booth was auctioned as nine stucco-faced brick fragments sawed from the wall and as an NFT.

The GCHQ has used the picture, as a symbolic image for "How does an analyst catch a terrorist?", on its "what we do" page, on its website.

References

External links 
 Banksy, Spy Booth Photo: Jules Annan/Barcroft Media 14 April 2014

2014 in art
English contemporary works of art
Culture in Cheltenham
Global surveillance
GCHQ
Graffiti in England
Works by Banksy
2014 in England
Lost works of art